Stronghold Kingdoms is a Massively multiplayer online real-time strategy game video game with a Medieval castle building theme.  It was developed by Firefly Studios and based upon their commercially successful and popular Stronghold series of games.  Firefly Studios started development of Stronghold Kingdoms in 2007 as their first entry into the MMO  genre.  The first Alpha test began in 2009 and was open to 150 players.

Reception
Stronghold Kingdoms has achieved a Metacritic score of 75, indicating generally favorable reviews.

Strategy Informer gave a score of 85/100, with reviewer Emmanuel Brown describing it as "mission accomplished" and saying that "for the most part, they get it absolutely right." Gaming XP's review praised how the classic Stronghold format was "implemented very well for this MMO".

References

External links
Official website
Stronghold Kingdoms at Firefly Studios

2012 video games
Android (operating system) games
Free online games
Free-to-play video games
IOS games
MacOS games
Massively multiplayer online real-time strategy games
Real-time strategy video games
Stronghold (series)
Video games developed in the United Kingdom
Video games set in castles
Video games set in the Middle Ages
Windows games